Eliseo Ruben Prado (17 September 1929 – 10 February 2016) was an Argentine football forward who played for Argentina in the 1958 FIFA World Cup. He also played for Club Atlético River Plate.

References

External links
FIFA profile

1929 births
2016 deaths
Argentine footballers
Argentina international footballers
Association football forwards
Club Atlético River Plate footballers
1958 FIFA World Cup players
Footballers from Buenos Aires